Dashrath Gagrai is an Indian politician who is a member of the Jharkhand Legislative Assembly. He represents the Kharsawan assembly constituency of Seraikela Kharsawan district.

References

Year of birth missing (living people)
Living people
21st-century Indian politicians
Jharkhand Mukti Morcha politicians